Central Cemetery may refer to the following cemeteries:
 Central Cemetery of Bogotá
 Central Cemetery of Montevideo
 Central Cemetery in Szczecin
 Vienna Central Cemetery